Shai Ben Ruby (born February 25, 2002, in Israel) is an Israeli retired individual and group rhythmic gymnast. She is the 2020 European Group All-around champion.

Career

Junior
In 2017, she joined Israeli junior group and competed at International Tournament Alina Cup in Moscow, where they took silver medal in Group All-around behind Russia. At the 2017 Junior European Championships in Budapest, Hungary they won silver medal in 10 Clubs final.

Senior
In 2018, she became senior and joined Israeli senior group. She made her World Championship debut at the 2018 World Championships in Sofia, Bulgaria, where she placed 15th in Group All-around. Her second World Championships participation was in 2019 in Baku, where she and her teammates placed 6th in Group All-around, 4th in 5 Balls final and 6th in 3 Hoops + 4 Clubs.
In November 2020, they won gold medal at the 2020 European Championships in Group All-around and silver in Team competition.

References

External links
 
 

Israeli rhythmic gymnasts
2002 births
Living people
Medalists at the Rhythmic Gymnastics European Championships